The Joseph Jefferson Award, more commonly known informally as the Jeff Award, is given for theatre arts produced in the Chicago area. Founded in 1968, the awards are named in tribute to actor Joseph Jefferson, a 19th-century American theater star who, as a child, was a player in Chicago's first theater company.  Two types of awards are given: "Equity" (annual judging season August 1st to July 31st) for work done under an Actors' Equity Association contract, and "Non-Equity" (annual judging season April 1st to March 31st) for non-union work. Award recipients are determined by a secret ballot.

Award categories
In 2018, the committee merged the actor and actress performance categories, eliminating gender from consideration. Two awards are now awarded from each of the new performance categories, ensemble awards remain singular:

Equity Awards
Performance categories

 Outstanding Performer in a Principal Role in a Play
 Outstanding Performer in a Supporting Role in a Play
 Outstanding Performer in a Principal Role in a Musical
 Outstanding Performer in a Supporting Role in a Musical

 Outstanding Ensemble in a Play
 Outstanding Ensemble in a Musical or Revue
 Outstanding Solo Performance
 Outstanding Performer in a Revue

Show and technical categories

 Outstanding Production of a Play
 Outstanding Production of a Musical
 Outstanding Production of a Revue
 Outstanding Direction of a Play
 Outstanding Direction of a Musical
 Outstanding Direction of a Revue
 Outstanding Music Direction
 Outstanding Choreography
 Outstanding Fight Choreography
 Outstanding New Play
 Outstanding New Musical
 Outstanding Adaptation
 Outstanding Original Music in a Play
 Outstanding Scenic Design
 Outstanding Costume Design
 Outstanding Lighting Design
 Outstanding Sound Design
 Outstanding Projections/Video Design

Special categories
 Outstanding Artistic Specialization
 Special Jeff Award (Equity) (includes Lifetime Achievement Award as well as Award for Outstanding Stage Management)

Former
Touring Production Award - formerly awarded to equity shows performed in, but produced outside of Chicago.  Under some circumstances where a Chicago theater subscription season includes such a show, that show may be eligible for the other awards.

Non-Equity Awards
Performance categories

 Outstanding Performance in a Principal Role in a Play
 Outstanding Performance in a Supporting Role in a Play
 Outstanding Performance in a Principal Role in a Musical or Revue
 Outstanding Performance in a Supporting Role in a Musical or Revue

 Outstanding Ensemble
 Outstanding Solo Performance

Show and technical categories

 Outstanding Production of a Play
 Outstanding Production of a Musical or Revue
 Outstanding Direction of a Play
 Outstanding Direction of a Musical or Revue
 Outstanding Music Direction
 Outstanding Choreography
 Outstanding New Work
 Outstanding Adaptation
 Outstanding Original Music in a Play
 Outstanding Scenic Design
 Outstanding Costume Design
 Outstanding Lighting Design
 Outstanding Sound Design

Special categories
 Outstanding Artistic Specialization
 Special Jeff Award (Non-Equity) (includes Lifetime Achievement Award as well as Award for Outstanding Stage Management)

History
Originally chartered to recognize only Equity productions, the Jeff Awards established the Non-Equity Wing in 1973 to reward achievement in non-union theatre.

The Joseph Jefferson Awards Committee evolved in response to a search by Chicago actors for a way to honor local theatre talent. In 1968, the Midwest Advisory Committee of Actors' Equity appointed member Felix Shuman to find a means of gaining recognition for actors working in the city. Joined by actors Guy Barile, Aviva Crane and June Travis Friedlob, Shuman identified and recruited twenty-four individuals active in education, business and social affairs. These individuals originally met for a luncheon at the Ivanhoe Theatre and went on to become the Joseph Jefferson Awards Committee under the first Chairmanship of Henry G. Plitt. Among the original members were three theatre supporters who would be active Jeff members two decades later—Morton Ries, Judith Sagan and Joseph Wolfson. The charter of the Jeff Committee today continues to honor excellence in the Chicago theatre community.

The first annual Jeff Awards ceremony was held in the Guildhall of the Ambassador West Hotel on October 6, 1969. It was attended by 175 people. Six awards were bestowed on the productions of seven theatres. In 1973 the Awards night was first telecast by CBS. During that same year, the Jeff Committee extended its coverage and recognition to include the productions of non-Equity theatres through the creation of a Non-Equity Wing of the Joseph Jefferson Awards Committee. Only five non-Equity theatres had productions judged in that first season, and three awards were presented the following fall. Currently these awards are given at a separate Non-Equity Wing Awards Night each spring.

Selection committee
The current Joseph Jefferson Committee consists of up to 55 men and women who come to the committee with an academic background in theatre, significant professional experience, a history of theatre involvement, and/or years of consistent theatre attendance in Chicago and in other major theatre capitals of the world. A volunteer, non-profit organization, The Jeff Committee does not have specific terms for its members. However, members must meet specific judging standards and can vote on the final ballot each season only if they have met their responsibilities for that complete year. While many of the judges have retained long-standing membership histories, a few rotate off each year as new members are invited to join the committee.

Nomination
Each year at the request of the theaters, the members of Jeff Committee see the Jeff-eligible, locally produced shows. They nominate and eventually select recipients "for outstanding achievement" in the following categories: Production, Director, Actor and Actress in a Principal Role, Actor and Actress in a Supporting Role, in the two categories of Plays and Musicals. Awards are also given for Production, Direction, Actor and Actress in a Revue, and Cameo Performance, as well as Ensemble, Choreography, Scenic Design, Lighting Design, Costume Design, Original Music, Musical Direction, Sound Design, New Work and Adaptation. Two general types of awards are given in each category: "Jeff Awards" are for work done under an Actors' Equity Association contract, while "Non-Equity Jeff Awards" are for non-union work. On occasion, special awards are given for achievements, accomplishments, or services in other areas of the theatre. Award recipients are determined by secret ballot.

The Equity Awards are available to theater companies within 45 miles of the intersection of State and Madison streets.  The Non-Equity Awards are available only to companies within the city limits of Chicago.

Criticism
The Jeff Awards and Committee have been criticized by Chicago theater professionals, specifically those in the non-Equity sector, for not recognizing critically acclaimed productions and seeming to not be willing to reward daring works in Chicago theater.  In a more outspoken criticism of the awards, Time Out Chicago has publishes a "They Wuz Robbed" feature for both the non-Equity and Equity nominations.

Notable awardees

Source:

Equity recipients
Joseph Jefferson Award for an Outstanding Actor in a Principal Role in a Musical
 1974: Robert LuPone in The Tooth of Crime – Goodman Theatre
 1979: John Reeger in Funeral March for a One-Man Band – St. Nicholas Theater Company
 1982: David Rounds in Herringbone – St. Nicholas Theater Company
 1985: Mark Jacoby in Nine – Candlelight Dinner Playhouse
 1996: Anthony Crivello in The House of Martin Guerre – Goodman Theatre
 1998: Brian Stepanek in Me and My Girl – Drury Lane Theatre
 2003: Richard Kind in Bounce – Goodman Theatre
 2007: David Hess in Shenandoah – Marriott Theatre
 2008: John Cudia in Les Misérables - Marriott Theatre
 2014: Matthew Brumlow in Hank Williams: Lost Highway – American Blues Theater
 2016: Nathaniel Stampley in Man of La Mancha -- Marriott Theatre

Joseph Jefferson Award for an Outstanding Actor in a Principal Role in a Play
 1971: Lee Pelty in Fiddler on the Roof – Candlelight Dinner Playhouse
 1974: Mark Medoff in When You Comin' Back, Red Ryder? – First Chicago Center
 2013: Michael Shannon in Simpatico – A Red Orchid Theatre
 2016: Dexter Zollicoffer in Charm – Northlight Theatre
Joseph Jefferson Award for an Outstanding Performer in a Principal Role in a Play
 2022: Sean Hayes in Good Night, Oscar -- Goodman Theatre

References

External links

American theater awards
Awards established in 1968
Organizations based in Chicago
Theatre in Chicago
1968 establishments in Illinois
Annual events in Illinois
CBS television specials